The Gospel of Cividale (or), at first named the Codex of Aquileia (Latin: ,),  is a medieval Latin transcript of the Gospel of Mark, written on parchment. It is named after Cividale del Friuli, a town in Friuli-Venezia Giulia (Northern Italy) where it is kept. It contains about 1500 Slavic and German names of pilgrims to the monastery of San Giovanni di Duino (today part of the Duino Aurisina municipality), written in the second half of the 9th and the first half of the 10th century. The monastery was a property of the Patriarchate of Aquileia.

The Gospel contains the first known Croatian autographs in a Latin text.

Contents
XXVIII Historia Langobardorum, by Paul the Deacon

References

Sources

 

Medieval books
Cultural history of Slovenia
10th century in Croatia
Christian manuscripts
9th-century Christian texts
10th-century Christian texts
Medieval Latin texts